Maqsud Jamil Mintoo  is a Bangladeshi music composer and director. He won the Bangladesh National Film Award for Best Music Director for the song "Ekta Chilo Sonar Konya" in the film Srabon Megher Din (1999).

Early life and career
Mintoo first played guitar in 1979. In 1982, he began working in film playback songs with Ahmed Imtiaz Bulbul. He played the guitar for the background score for the film Megh Bijli Badol.

Mintoo first worked as a music director in the film Agun Jalo, directed by Motin Rahman. The film featured the song "Elomelo Batashe", rendered by singer Baby Naznin. He worked as composer and music director in several films by Humayun Ahmed. In 1986 Mintoo released an audio album for Shaikh Ishtiak named Nondita. In 1987 he released an audio album for Baby Naznin. In 2009, Mintoo released an audio album for Subir Nandi titled Shonar Konya. Mintoo composed station ID music for Bangladesh Television, NTV, Channel 9. Mintoo debuted theme-music composition for the television dramas with "Jekhane Dekhibe Chhai" in 1988. He went on to compose for more than 5000 dramas including Gronthik-gon Kohe by Selim Al Deen, Shirsho Bindu by Abdullah Al Mamun and Kothao Keu Nei by Mohammad Barkatullah.

Works
Films Scores
 1995: Agun jole
 1999: Srabon Megher Din
 2001: Dui Duari
 2003: Chandrakotha
 2004: Shyamol Chhaya
 2012: Ghetu Putro Komola
Songs:
 Nilanjona ( Sheikh Ishtiak )
 Josna rate( Sheikh Ishtiak )
 Ekdin Ghum Venge ( Sheikh Ishtiak )
 Elomelo Batashe ( Baby Naznin )
 Oi Rangdhu ( Baby Naznin )
 Poreche Lal Shari ( Baby Naznin )
 Ekta Chilo Sonar Konya (Subir Nandi)
 O Amar Ural Ponkhi Re (Subir Nandi)
 Ami onek Bathar Srabon ( Tapan Chowdhury )
 Chadni poshore ( Selim Chowdhury )
 Amar Vanga ghore ( Sabina Yasmin )
 Boroshar prothom dine ( Sabina Yasmin )
 Sajano Holona Kicku ( Tapan Chowdhury )
 Kono Ek Shondhai ( Shuvro Dev )
Television dramas
 1993: Kothao Keu Nei
 1998: Jekhane Dekhibe Chhai
 1999: Aaj Robibar
 2005: Khanda Chitra
 2005: Neerey Tar Neel Dheu
 2007: Tulite Aka Swapno
 2008: Mem Saheb

Albums
 1986:   Nondita
 1987:   Potro Mita
 2009: Shonar Konya
 2016: Abar Dujone

References

External links

Living people
Bangladeshi music directors
Bangladeshi film score composers
Best Music Director National Film Award (Bangladesh) winners
Year of birth missing (living people)
Place of birth missing (living people)